Phil Conley may refer to:

Philip Mallory Conley (1887–1979), American historian
Philip Ransom Conley (1934–2014), American athlete